The plain thornbird (Phacellodomus inornatus) is a species of bird in the ovenbird family Furnariidae.

Taxonomy
The plain thornbird was formally described in 1887 by the American ornithologist Robert Ridgway based on a specimen collected in Caracas, Venezuela. He coined the binomial name Phacellodomus inornatus. The specific epithet is Latin meaning "plain" or "unadorned".

The plain thornbird is sometimes considered conspecific with the rufous-fronted thornbird (Phacellodomus rufifrons). Support for treating the plain thornbird as a separate species was provided by a 2020 study that compared mitochondrial DNA sequences.
 
Two subspecies are recognised:

 P. i. inornatus Ridgway, 1887 – north-central Venezuela
 P. i. castilloi Phelps Jr & Aveledo, 1987 – northeast Colombia and west, central Venezuela

Description
It is similar in appearance to the rufous-fronted thornbird but lacks the rufous forecrown.

Distribution and habitat
It is found in Venezuela and northeast Columbia. Its natural habitats are subtropical or tropical dry forest, dry savanna, subtropical or tropical dry shrubland, subtropical or tropical high-altitude shrubland, and heavily degraded former forest.

References

plain thornbird
Birds of Bolivia
Birds of Venezuela
plain thornbird